The Dutch Eredivisie in the 1987–88 season was contested by 18 teams. PSV Eindhoven won the championship.

League standings

Results

Play-offs
This year, play-offs were held for one UEFA-Cup spot.

See also
 1987–88 Eerste Divisie
 1987–88 KNVB Cup

References

 Eredivisie official website - info on all seasons 

Eredivisie seasons
Netherlands
1987–88 in Dutch football